Petra Schlitzer (born 12 April 1975) is an Austrian sprint canoeist who competed in the mid-2000s. She won a silver medal in the K-2 500 m event at the 2005 ICF Canoe Sprint World Championships in Zagreb. She lives in Ebental near Klagenfurt.

References

Austrian female canoeists
Living people
ICF Canoe Sprint World Championships medalists in kayak
1975 births